A manor house is a type of historical building.

Manor House may also refer to:

Specific buildings

In England, UK

Buildings named Manor House
Listed in alphabetical order of location.
Manor House, 21 Soho Square, in central London
Manor House, Chew Magna, in Somerset
Manor House, Gisburn Forest, in Lancashire
Manor House, Hale, in Cheshire
Manor House, Raunds,  in Northamptonshire, England
Manor House, Sleaford, in Lincolnshire
Manor House (Sutton Courtenay), in Oxfordshire
Manor House, West Coker, Somerset

Buildings that are manor houses
Listed in alphabetical order of name.
Alford Manor House in Lincolnshire
Boston Manor House in the London Borough of Hounslow
Burton Agnes Manor House in Yorkshire
Chenies Manor House in Buckinghamshire
Eastbury Manor House in the London Borough of Barking and Dagenham
Mitford Old Manor House in Mitford, Northumberland
Princes Risborough Manor House, in  Buckinghamshire
Widcombe Manor House in Bath

In other countries 
Listed in alphabetical order of country name.
Manor House School, Raheny in Raheny, Dublin, Ireland
Manor House School, Cairo in Cairo, Egypt
The Manor House, Kandy, a hotel in Sri Lanka
Manor House (Chicago), Illinois, USA
Manor House (Naples, Maine), in Maine, USA
Manor House (Kenosha, Wisconsin), USA

Places

In London, England, UK
Manor House, London, a district on the border of the London Boroughs of Haringey and Hackney
Manor House tube station, a station on the Piccadilly line of the London Underground

Other uses 
The Manor Studio, a recording studio in Oxfordshire, England
The Edwardian Country House, a UK Channel 4 mini-series, shown on PBS as Manor House
The First Republic, a Czech drama TV series also airing as The Manor House

See also

 
 Manor (disambiguation)
 House (disambiguation)